Monsignor Guy-Marie Bagnard, born Guy Claude Bagnard (born April 14, 1937), is a former French Roman Catholic Bishop of Belley-Ars, from July 16, 1987 (date of his nomination) to June 15, 2012 (date of resignation).

History
Guy Bagnard was born in Montceau-les-Mines, France. He studied at the little seminary of Rimont, at the academic Seminary of Lyon (with the Catholic University of Lyon), at the Catholic Institute of Paris, and finally, at the Sorbonne University. He graduated in Theology and in Philosophy (D.E.A., in the French academic system). He was ordained to the priesthood on June 29, 1965. Named bishop on July 16, 1987, he was consecrated on October 4 in the same year, by Cardinal Albert Decourtray.

Recently, Guy Bagnard published Le Curé d'Ars, Portrait d'un Pasteur, a book which speaks about the life, the spirituality and the teaching of John Vianney.

References

Sources
Catholic Hierarchy: Guy Bagnard

1937 births
Living people
People from Montceau-les-Mines
Bishops of Belley